The brownspotted catshark (Scyliorhinus garmani) is a rare catshark of the family Scyliorhinidae, found in the Indo-West Pacific between latitudes 11° N and 12° S. Its juvenile length is about 38 cm, but its adult size is mostly unknown. The reproduction of this catshark is oviparous. The specific name garmani was dedicated to Samuel Walton Garman (1843–1927), renowned herpetologist and ichthyologist of the Museum of Comparative Zoology of Harvard University.

References

 

brownspotted catshark
Fish of the Philippines
brownspotted catshark